There is no current State Route 11 in the U.S. state of Alabama.

See U.S. Route 11 in Alabama for the current route numbered 11
See Alabama State Route 11 (pre-1957) for the former SR 11